is a regional airport serving Kōzushima in the northern Izu Islands, Tokyo, Japan. It began operations in July 1992.

Airlines and destinations

Gallery

References

Airports in Tokyo
Transport in the Greater Tokyo Area